
Gmina Bobrowice is a rural gmina (administrative district) in Krosno Odrzańskie County, Lubusz Voivodeship, in western Poland.

Villages
Gmina Bobrowice contains the villages and settlements of Barłogi, Bobrowice, Bronków, Bronkówek, Brzezinka, Chojnowo, Chromów, Czeklin, Dachów, Dęby, Dychów, Janiszowice, Kołatka, Kukadło, Lubnica, Młyniec, Prądocinek, Przychów, Strużka, Tarnawa Krośnieńska, Wełmice and Żarków.

Neighbouring gminas
Gmina Bobrowice is bordered by the gminas of Dąbie, Gubin, Krosno Odrzańskie, Lubsko and Nowogród Bobrzański.

References

Bobrowice
Krosno Odrzańskie County